Julian Knowle and Jürgen Melzer were the defending champions.

Simon Aspelin and Todd Perry won the title, defeating Knowle and Melzer 6–1, 7–6(7–3) in the final.

Seeds

Draw

Draw

External links
Draw

St. Petersburg Open
2006 ATP Tour
2006 in Russian tennis